Tuchekoi is a rural locality in the Gympie Region, Queensland, Australia.

History 
The locality takes its namefrom  Mount Tuchekoi, which in turn is believed to be a corruption of the Kabi language dha/chu/koi meaning place of fig trees.

Geography
The Mary River forms the western boundary, while Skyring Creek forms the northern boundary on its way to join the Mary.

References 

Gympie Region
Localities in Queensland